Megachile punctolineata is a species of bee in the family Megachilidae. It was described by Theodore Dru Alison Cockerell in 1934.

References

Punctolineata
Insects described in 1934